La Palabra (born Rodolfo M. Foster in  Caimanera, Cuba) is a bandleader,  singer-songwriter,  pianist,  record producer, and  arranger, known for his versatile approach to music, particularly his invention of the Salsa romantica Latin music genre and his signature style of Afro-Cuban-influenced, sensual Latin jazz.

Early years

La Palabra was born and raised in the small coastal town of Caimanera, Cuba.  He loved music from an early age and grew up listening to Cuban artists like Orquesta Aragón, Estrellas Cubanas Orquesta, Pello el Afrokán (Pedro Izquierdo), Tata Guines, and Félix Chappottín.  He was exposed to all genres of Cuban music -- charanga, son, danzón, cha-cha-cha, bolero, bolero-cha, rumba, sipisón, mozambique, paca, joropo, changüí, mozan-cha, guaguancó, and early Afro-Cuban jazz precursors to salsa.

At the age of 11, La Palabra began taking piano lessons from his grandmother and, inspired by Neno Gonzalez's song "El Café," was soon writing his own arrangements.  After winning an amateur musical competition judged by representatives from the Department of Education, he was invited to attend a state-controlled school of music in Havana. La Palabra's grandmother turned down the opportunity down out of fear that La Palabra would be unable to leave Fidel Castro's post-revolutionary Cuba if he became a student at the state music conservatory.  The almost constant flow of music, musicians, and tourists to and from the U.S. and Cuba that had taken place since the 1930s and 1940s  was quickly halted.  A few years later La Palabra's family successfully obtained their official visas to leave Cuba.  He moved to New York City with his sister, aunt, and uncle in 1966.

In New York La Palabra entered the music scene by joining the sextet Lalo y La New Yorkina and played piano on their first single,  "Rompe Tu Pared," with Hector Casanova on vocals.  La Palabra continued playing with Lalo y La New Yorkina for two more years until 1968, when his mother decided to move the family to Detroit. He witnessed the cultural upheaval taking place in American society and in music -- hippie psychedelia, New York salsa, anti-Vietnam War anthems, Berry Gordy's Motown artists, the closely knit Detroit jazz community, Detroit-born Chicago blues singers (John Lee Hooker, Sonny Boy Williamson) even the occasional Latin artist (Joe Cuba) on American Bandstand.

As a student of Cooley High School in Detroit, La Palabra became involved with as many aspects of the music department as possible and, most importantly, founded the school's first integrated band, The Blazers, which beat The Sons of Soul out of first place at the 1969 Michigan State Fair (where The Jackson Five was the main act) with their compelling performance of "Son of Ice Bag." The Sons of Soul drummer at the time was Ricky Lawson, who later moved to Los Angeles to become a studio musician and played on Michael Jackson's Thriller.  While La Palabra found regular work playing high-powered R&B cover tunes by Hugh Masakela, Chicago, Tower of Power, B.B. King and Hubert Laws, he began writing his first romantic song arrangements, lyrics and orchestrations, including his first-to-be-recorded salsa song "Amor de Juventud," which was later recorded by Ricardo Lemvo in the early 1980s.

By 1974 La Palabra had outgrown the high school music scene and began playing at El Sol Supper Club in Detroit. The 18-year-old performer and arranger dazzled audiences week after week with his quick-finger piano playing and romantic Spanish ballad-style singing of English cover tunes, delivered  with  Palabra's own mixture of Cuban guaguanco, salsa, soul, and rock and roll. One of his sidemen at El Sol was trumpeter Marcus Belgrave; another regular sideman was the young percussionist Humberto "El Nengue" Hernandez, also born in Cuba and later to become a Mongo Santamaria sideman.

For the next several years, La Palabra continued playing the Detroit club circuit, alternating between Stanley Mitchell and the People's Choice, Brainstorm (featuring violinist Regina Carter), the Five Specials, and Norma Belle and the All Stars, while sharing the circuit with Earl Klugh, Chapter 7 (with lead singer Anita Baker,) Dennis Coffey, Lyman Woodard, and the Organization. In 1977, La Palabra went on tour with Brainstorm (who later appeared on Soul Train) and the Five Specials. The tour included Kool and the Gang, the Average White Band, and Fat Back Band. Following the tour La Palabra joined Norma Belle's band, with whom he played until 1979.

Godfather of Romantic Salsa

Stevie Wonder's band members saw La Palabra performing in Norma Belle's band in Detroit, Michigan and immediately recommended him to Wonder.  In September 1979 Wonder invited La Palabra to move to Los Angeles to join Phoenix Rising, the band Wonder was planning to assemble and produce. La Palabra viewed the chance to work for Stevie Wonder as a launching pad for his career and immediately headed to the West Coast, only to discover that the project was still only in the early planning stages.  Without a job or record deal of his own, La Palabra began playing piano at local gigs with various Los Angeles groups. 
 
Several months later, in 1980, American pop singer Lionel Richie achieved massive widespread success with his hit single "Lady," while Spanish balladeers Roberto Carlos and Emanuel reached the top of the Latin charts with their respective hits "Cama y Mesa" and "Todo Se Derrumbo." La Palabra, caught up in this romantic movement in music, began experimenting combining his native Cuban rhythms and American pop music.  He created a new genre of Latin music that combined sexually charged romanticism with high energy salsa, which he named Ballada en Salsa (later renamed and marketed as romantic salsa or salsa romántica by major record labels).

In December 1979 La Palabra partnered with Jesús "El Niño" Alejandro Perez to form Orquesta Versalles.  La Palabra and "El Niño" showcased their new arrangements weekly, packing such popular nightclubs as Club Candilejas in Los Angeles, Club Riviera in Eagle Rock, and the Marina Hotel in Las Vegas. In early 1981 La Palabra (working as Fito Foster) and El Niño released a single as Orquesta Versalles (a.k.a. Orquesta Candilejas), with El Niño's arrangement of "Me Voy Pa’ Puerto Rico" on side A and La Palabra's arrangement of "Todo Se Derrumbo" on Side B. "Todo Se Derrumbo" became such a hit that Orquesta Versalles club audiences requested Versalles to play it three to four times a night.

"Todo se Derrumbo" attracted the attention of Joni Figueras, a music industry insider, frequent visitor at Club Candilejas, and fan of Versalles and La Palabra's arrangements. Figueras approached La Palabra and suggested that the two of them produce an album of La Palabra's arrangements to introduce the public to Ballada en Salsa / Salsa Romantica. La Palabra was intrigued by the idea but unable to start such a large-scale project while still contracted to work for Stevie Wonder and Phoenix Rising.  Figueras forged ahead with the Salsa Romantica album without him, using musicians Louis Ramirez and Ray de la Paz to record Noche Caliente for K-Tel Records. As a result of one hastily released album, Ramirez and de la Paz were inaccurately called "the pioneers of salsa romantica."

In 1982 Stevie Wonder's team decided to abandon the Phoenix Rising project altogether.  Although it was a disappointment to La Palabra, the official announcement was unsurprising.  He had already been working with other bands since arriving in Los Angeles, and the following year Orquesta Versalles was deemed one of Los Angeles’ pioneering salsa bands.  They released their debut self-titled album on Profono Records (then a division of CBS Records), which contained La Palabra's classic interpretation of Lionel Richie's  "Lady,"  which became an overnight international success in dance clubs.

La Palabra relocated his band to Miami, Florida in 1984, believing the city to be the heartbeat of the Latin music industry. He enjoyed success with Orquesta Versalles there for several months, never fully aware of the impact "Lady" was making on Latin music in the rest of the world. Believing Profono Records failed to meet his expectations, with this album my wife Luz Damaris  Foster (now DeJesus) collaborated with the song"Lady the laugh was it !! even Madonna used her laugh style. She wrote three songs, her first song was "Ya se Fue", second song  "Mi negrita" and "te imaginas" was both lyrics until  La Palabra left the label in 1984.

In 1985 La Palabra, who had been working as "Fito Foster" began to officially use his artistic name, "La Palabra," and formed a new group called Sensation 85 with former members of Versalles.  That year the band released a self-titled debut album featuring Cuban jazz flautist Nestor Torres and Nicaraguan bongo player Luis Enrique on vocals, Enrique's first outing as a salsa singer.

Sensation 85 enjoyed popularity at Miami dance clubs, filling venues such as the Riviera Lounge (later renamed Club Capri), Papa Grande (Big Daddy's), Maxim's Supper Club, the Copacabana, and Salsa 2000.

Even as more and more newcomer Salsa Romantica artists were offered lucrative recording deals with major labels in the late 1980s, including two of his own band members from Sensation 85 (Luis Enrique and Lefty Perez), the genre's creator unjustly remained unsigned.  Understandably disillusioned and devastated, La Palabra left the music industry from 1988 until 1999, when he returned to Los Angeles.

Orquesta La Palabra and Latin Jazz

In late 1999 La Palabra began recording a new album, Rap-A-Salsa, with the help of Chuck Neustein. Halfway through the recording, George Balmaseda, whom La Palabra knew from the Orquesta Versalles days, introduced Mel Morrow of Morrowland Records to Palabra. Morrow, who adored La Palabra's arrangements and his musical style, offered to finance the formation of a band with La Palabra. La Palabra abandoned the  Rap-A-Salsa project and joined Morrow in the formation of the band, Orquesta La Palabra, with George "Babaloo" Balmaseda and Angelo Pagan on vocals.

With Morrow as executive producer, La Palabra and Morrow began the recording of the album On Fire in Los Angeles. The recording reached completion a year later and featured La Palabra's versions of "Todo Se Derrumbo" and "Lady." "Lady" became a major hit once again, being played throughout the United States and abroad including Europe, Asia, Israel, and Latin America, inspiring a new wave of interest among younger fans and sparking new interest in La Palabra.

In 2003, La Palabra recorded the album Breakthrough with Tornillo Records, which included the hit song, "El Tun Tun de Tu Corazon." It maintained the # 1 spot on Colombia radio for 12 consecutive weeks in 2006 and continued to be played on heavy rotation for most of 2007.  Thanks to the song's success, La Palabra toured throughout Latin America and Europe.  His hard-working, old-school showmanship reminded one of Latin jazz bandleaders like Tito Puente. Orquesta La Palabra was invited to perform at the 2008 Olympic Games in Beijing, China, including "I'm Going to Shenzhen" (specifically requested by the mayor of Shenzhen) at the opening ceremonies.  La Palabra also played at the Grand Millenium Hotel, China Doll Nightclub, Susie Wong Nightclub, Block 8 Nightclub, the International Salsa Festival, and the 2008 Salsa Congress.

La Palabra fully returned to his Cuban roots in 2009 with the release of Musicholic.  The music he had been writing since meeting Mel Morrow was increasingly heavily influenced by the eclectic rhythms and musical styles he heard as a child and adolescent, as well as the more modern Latin jazz he heard as a teen-ager in New York and Detroit.    His sophisticated style of Afro-Cuban jazz, while unmistakably his own, is in the tradition of Maraca, Mario Bauza and his Afro-Cuban Orchestra, Bebo Valdés, Poncho Sanchez, Oscar D'León, Chucho Valdés (the founder and musical director of Irakere, Cuba's top jazz orchestra), Jerry Gonzalez's Fort Apache jazz group from the late 1970s, early innovator Machito, the spirit of experimentation of Pucho and His Latin Brothers' acid-jazz from the late 1960s, Ray Barretto, and even hints of classic Eddie Palmieri.

Discography
 Earthquake (unreleased), 1974
 "Todo Se Derrumbo" single, 1981
 with Orquesta Versalles:
 with Sensation '85:
 Sensation 85, 1985
 with Orquesta La Palabra:
 On Fire (Morrowland Records), 2000
 Breakthrough (Tornillo Records), 2003
 Musicholic (Tornillo Records), 2009

Sources

"Orquesta  Versalles", Diario Las Americas, June 6, 1984, page 9B.
"Black Cubans: Apart in Two Worlds", The New York Times, December 2, 1987, page 13.
"Calendar Weekend: La Vida Loca", Los Angeles Times, July 1, 1999, page 6.
"Salsa de Hollywood para el Mundo", La Opinion, October 18, 2000, page 6B.
"Palabra and Salsa Romantica", Latin Beat Magazine, October 2001.
"La Palabra Turns a Concept into An Identity", Sabor Magazine, March 2001, page 30.
"Salsa Para Apagar La Luz", Al Borde, September 25, 2003.
"On Deck", Los Angeles WAVE, October 2, 2003.
"Orquesta La Palabra", Billboard, January 17, 2004.
"Palabra's Sound Goes On", Latin Beat Magazine, May 2005, page 29.
"La Palabra: A Taste of Cuba", Estreno de Musica Y Video, December 2005, page 6.
"Salsa De Hollywood Para El Mundo", 20 De Mayo, April 15, 2006, No. 2384.
"La Palabra", Que Pasa Bulletin, April 2006.
"Chango Tiene La Palabra", El Pais (Cali Colombia), August 2, 2006, page D3.
"La Palabra por Primera Vez en Cali", Diario Occidente (Cali Colombia), July 28, 2006, page 20.
"Sazon Cubano en Hollywood", La Voz Libre, November 23, 2006.

1951 births
Living people
Cuban jazz composers
Cuban jazz pianists
Cuban songwriters
Male songwriters
Salsa music
Male pianists
21st-century pianists
Male jazz composers
21st-century male musicians
Cooley High School alumni
Musicians from Detroit